DNO may refer to:
The Danish Nurses' Organization, a trade union for nurses in Denmark
Director of Naval Ordnance, British Admiralty administration
Distribution network operator, companies licensed to distribute electricity in Great Britain
Dno (air base), a former air base in Russia located 4 km south of Dno
DNO ASA, a Norwegian oil company
Drang nach Osten, a term coined in the 19th century to designate German expansion into Slavic lands
Dutch National Opera, based in Amsterdam, The Netherlands